Chandulal Patel (born 10 October 1965) is an Indian politician of the BJP. On 23 November 2016 he was elected to the Maharashtra Legislative Council from Local Areas Constituency of Jalgaon.

References

1965 births
Living people
Bharatiya Janata Party politicians from Maharashtra